Higher Education GAA is the governing body overseeing the Gaelic games of hurling, camogie and Gaelic football at third level institutions. The body coordinates competitions in both Ireland and Britain, and is a part of the parent organisation, the Gaelic Athletic Association. The main competitions are the Fitzgibbon Cup for hurling and Sigerson Cup for football.

Hurling

Fitzgibbon Cup

The Fitzgibbon Cup is named after Edwin Fitzgibbon, a Capuchin friar and, from 1911 to 1936, a professor of philosophy at University College Cork.

In 1912 Fitzgibbon donated most of his annual salary to purchase the trophy. For the first 30 years, the cup was dominated by UCC and UCD, with UCG winning occasionally. Queen's University Belfast first took part in 1946, and won their only title in 1953.

The popularity of the championship grew, and, in the 1960s and 1970s three more colleges entered: Trinity College, Dublin, UU Coleraine and NUI Maynooth. In the late 1980s, all teams in Division One of the Higher Education League were admitted. Since the event went open, in the 1990s, several newer third level institutions from Limerick and Waterford entered and quickly dominated the competition. Waterford IT won the title four times in six years, but UCC are the leaders in the roll of honour, with 39 titles, the last in 1998.

Gaelic football

Sigerson Cup

In 1911, the Sigerson Cup was first presented by George Sigerson to foster unity amongst the constituent colleges of the National Universities of Ireland, which was won for the first time by UCD. The competition has since broadened its membership with teams representing a wider variety of Universities and College.

Gaelic games in British universities

Gaelic football

Gaelic football is organised at about 40 different universities in Britain from the strongest teams - JMU and St. Mary's - down to newer and weaker teams such as Worcester and Lincoln. The ancient universities of Cambridge and Oxford also compete in an annual Varsity Match. Since 2003 the main competition - the University Championships - have been recognised by the British Universities Sports Association.

Hurling

Hurling - although at a smaller level - is also growing the UK. Nine teams took part in the most recent British University Hurling Championship.  A select team play annually against the Scottish Universities Shinty team.

Ladies' Gaelic football
A championship also exists for Ladies' Gaelic football - the British University Ladies' Gaelic football Championship. The current holders are Liverpool Hope University College.

External links
 Higher Education Draws for 2007
 Sigerson Cup (football)
 Fitzgibbon Cup (hurling)
 BU GAA Website

 
Gaelic games governing bodies in Ireland